The Medan Post and Telegraph Office (Indonesian: Kantor Pos Medan) is a historic building in Medan, Indonesia.  It was designed by Ir. S. Snuyf from Burgelijke Openbare Werken (BOW) and opened in 1911. Located in downtown Medan, several other important colonial era buildings are located nearby including Old City Hall Medan, Inna Dharma Deli Hotel, Grand Mosque, Maimoon Palace, Immanuel Church, Tjong A Fie Mansion and Sri Mariamman Temple. The post office remains in operation and includes a stamp collection exhibit. Snuyf also designed Palembang City Hall (built 1928–1931). A fountain in front of the post office was a tribute to Jacob Nienhuys.

See also

List of colonial buildings in Medan

References

Buildings and structures in Medan
Post office buildings in Indonesia
Dutch colonial architecture in Indonesia